Carmarthen Priory, now virtually disappeared, was a monastic settlement which pre-dated the Norman Conquest. It was dedicated to St John the Evangelist and the Celtic saint Teulyddog. The Black Book of Carmarthen, an early Welsh language text, is believed to have been created at the Priory.

Origins
A Celtic monastic settlement, Llandeulyddog, existed at Carmarthen prior to the Norman Conquest. Following the establishment of a royal castle at Carmarthen in 1109, the newly built St Peter's Church and the older church at Llandeulyddog were placed under the jurisdiction of Battle Abbey. In 1125, however, ownership reverted to the Bishop of St Davids who established an Augustinian priory on the site.

The Black Book of Carmarthen
In the late twelfth or early thirteenth centuries, Llyfr Du Caerfyrddin (the Black Book of Carmarthen) was transcribed at the priory. It is the earliest complete manuscript in the Welsh language, being a combination of transcriptions of older manuscripts and original works produced at the time and transcribed by an individual monk. It survived the dissolution of the monasteries in the sixteenth century and is now held at the National Library of Wales.

The ruins were destroyed in the eighteenth century to make way for a lead smelting works.

References

Sources

Buildings and structures in Carmarthen
Former Christian monasteries in the United Kingdom